The Ash Grove is a traditional Welsh folk song whose melody has been set to numerous sets of lyrics. The best-known English lyrics were written by Thomas Oliphant in the 19th century.

History

The first published version of the tune was in 1802 in The Bardic Museum, a book written by the harpist Edward Jones. About four years later a version with words appeared, under the name Llwyn Onn. It tells of a sailor's love for "Gwen of Llwyn". At the end of the song, Gwen dies, and in one version of the piece, the writer talks about him mourning and that she is lying neath the shades of the lonely ash grove". The tune might be much older, as a similar air appears in The Beggar's Opera by John Gay (1728), in the song "Cease Your Funning". This was arranged by Beethoven in his Twelve Scottish Songs, WoO 156 No. 5. In 1922, the English folksong collector Frank Kidson claimed that Gay's air derives from the morris dance tune "Constant Billy", which is first known in Playford's Dancing Master (1665).

An English-language version of "The Ash Grove" was published in 1862, in Volume I of Welsh Melodies, with Welsh and English Poetry, compiled by the harpist John Thomas, with Welsh words by John Jones (Talhaiarn) and English words by Thomas Oliphant. The first verse of this version is incorporated into a different interpretation by the English dramatist and translator John Oxenford. John Jones (Talhaiarn) also wrote English lyrics for "The Ash Grove", 'All hail to thee, Cambria', which appeared with his Welsh lyrics in Owain Alaw's Gems of Welsh Melody in 1860: http://hdl.handle.net/10107/4796728

The tune of "The Ash Grove" was used for the Thanksgiving hymn "Let All Things Now Living", composed in 1939 by Katherine K. Davis. The popularity of this hymnal version led to the tune's being included on a number of Christmas albums up through the 1950s, such as Jan August's 1955 album Christmas Favorites (Mercury Records #MG 20160). It had, however, been in use as a hymn tune long before the 20th century under the title "The Master Hath Come" by Sarah Doudney (1871), updated since in a retelling of the nativity story by Robert Cullinan entitled "On This Night Most Holy" (1996).

Another hymn set to the tune of "The Ash Grove" is "Sent Forth by God's Blessing."

"The Ash Grove" was also used by Michael Forster in his setting of the Gloria for use in the Roman Catholic mass. It was published as "Sing glory to God" in Liturgical Hymns Old and New 1999 by Kevin Mayhew Ltd.

Roger Quilter's setting of the song was included in the Arnold Book of Old Songs, published in 1950, with new lyrics by Rodney Bennett.

Benjamin Britten's arrangement for voice and piano was published in his Folk Song Arrangements, Vol 1: The British Isles (1943)

Around 1962 a song called "The Irish Free State" was written to this tune.

Early in John Ford's film How Green Was My Valley, adapted from Richard Llewellyn's 1939 novel of the same name, "The Ash Grove" is sung in Welsh by a group of miners.

"The Ash Grove" featured in the 1980 BBC mini-series Pride and Prejudice. The tune is also featured in Black & White, a 2001 video game by Lionhead Studios; the lyrics are altered to accord with the game's plot.

Ed Pearl's Ash Grove folk music club at 8162 Melrose Avenue in Los Angeles was named after the song. The club opened in 1958 and closed in 1973. The Greenbriar Boys, Lightnin' Hopkins, Mississippi John Hurt, Doc Watson, Ry Cooder, and many others performed there.

The traditional bawdy song "The Mayor of Bayswater", also known as "The Hairs of her Dickey-dido", is also sung to the tune of "The Ash Grove".

Oliphant lyrics

Oxenford lyrics

Sheet music gallery

References

External links 
 Free typeset sheet music from Cantorion.org
 Various lyrics from Boudicca's Bard
 Search at Coelas.org (http://www.ceolas.org/cgi-bin/ht2/ht2-fc/case=yes; and input "Cease Your Funning")
 Possible origins of the tune
 The Irish Free State

1802 songs
British folk songs
Welsh folk songs